The Under Secretary of Agriculture for Natural Resources and Environment, or USA(NRE), is a high-ranking official in the United States Department of Agriculture and the principal advisor to the United States Secretary of Agriculture on policy to promote the conservation and sustainable use of the Nation's natural resources. 

The Under Secretary is appointed by the President of the United States with the consent of the United States Senate to serve at the pleasure of the President. The current Under Secretary is Homer Wilkes as of February 11, 2022.

Overview
The Under Secretary of Agriculture for Natural Resources and Environment promotes the conservation and sustainable use of natural resources on the Nation's private lands and sustains production of all the goods and services that the public demands of the national forests. The Under Secretary is responsible for the day-to-day operations of the United States Forest Service and Natural Resources Conservation Service.

With the rank of Under Secretary, the USC(NRE) is a Level III position within the Executive Schedule. Since January 2010, the annual rate of pay for Level III is $165,300.

Reporting officials
Officials reporting to the USA(NRE) include:
Deputy Under Secretary of Agriculture for Natural Resources and Environment - Forestry
Deputy Under Secretary of Agriculture for Natural Resources and Environment - Natural Resources
Chief of the Forest Service 
United States Forest Service

References

External links
The website of Natural Resources and Environment
The biography of Robert Bonnie